Area codes 416, 647, and 437 are telephone area codes in the North American Numbering Plan (NANP) for the city of Toronto, Ontario, Canada. Area code 416 is one of the original North American area codes created by the American Telephone and Telegraph Company (AT&T) in 1947. Area codes 647 and 437 are additional area codes for the same numbering plan area (NPA), forming an overlay numbering plan.

The incumbent local exchange carrier in the 416/647/437 territory is Bell Canada. Almost all Toronto Bell Canada landlines are in area code 416, with 647 numbers allocated disproportionately to a growing mobile telephone market and to competitive local exchange providers (such as cable and voice-over-IP gateways). Local numbers are portable, with few limited exceptions for specific services such as pocket pagers.

The competitive local exchange carriers for 416/647/437 are Rogers, Telus, and some independent companies.

Demand for telephone numbers with area code 416 for mobile, foreign exchange and voice over IP service in the 905 suburbs (Durham, Peel, York and Halton regions) has elevated the local significance of these numbers as their local calling area is a superset of that of a suburban number.

History

Toronto's original manual telephone exchanges were recognized by an exchange name and a block of four-digit line numbers. The "GRover exchange" at Kingston Road and Main Street in East Toronto became the first Canadian dial exchange in 1924. Montréal got its first dial telephones one year later. The numbers were dialled as two letters and four digits (2L+4N). Grover 1234 was dialled GR-1234 (or 47-1234). Conversion to seven-digit (2L+5N) format began in 1951, and continued until the introduction of direct distance dialling in 1958. The main area code, 416, was one of the 86 original area codes, which were introduced in 1947. It covered most of the populous Golden Horseshoe region in southern Ontario, from Colborne to Niagara Falls to Kitchener-Waterloo. It was almost completely surrounded by Ontario's other area code, 613. Ontario and Quebec were the only provinces to be assigned multiple area codes at the inception of the continent-wide numbering plan.

Area code 416 has been split twice. The western portion of 416 (including Kitchener) was combined with the southern portion of area code 613 to form area code 519 in 1953, which left 416 largely co-extensive with the area that is generally reckoned as the core of the Golden Horseshoe. Despite rapid growth in the Greater Toronto Area (GTA), that configuration remained for 40 years.

By the late 1980s, however, 416 was close to exhaustion because of the GTA's continued growth and Canada's inefficient number allocation system. Canada does not use number pooling as a relief measure. All competing carriers are assigned 10,000-number blocks, which correspond roughly to a single prefix, in each rate centre in which it plans to offer service, regardless of its actual subscriber count. Most rate centres do not need nearly that many numbers to serve their customers, but a number cannot be allocated elsewhere once it has been assigned to a carrier and rate centre. That resulted in thousands of wasted numbers.  The problem was less severe in the Golden Horseshoe than in other areas of Canada since then, as now, numbers tended to be used up fairly quickly because of the area's dramatic growth.

Nonetheless, the GTA's rapid growth and the proliferation of cell phones, fax machines, and pagers made it obvious that the Golden Horseshoe needed another area code. In 1993, area code 416 had its territory reduced to its current size to just Metropolitan Toronto (York, East York, North York, Etobicoke, Scarborough and Old Toronto). Area code 905 was then assigned to most of Toronto's suburbs and almost completely surrounds 416. The split began on October 13, 1993, but permissive dialing of 416 continued throughout the Golden Horseshoe until January 1, 1994. The GTA would have likely needed another area code at some point given its explosive growth, but the 905 split might have been delayed if it had been possible to reallocate numbers from the Golden Horseshoe's smaller rate centres to Toronto.

With the amalgamation of Metro Toronto into the "megacity" of Toronto in 1998, 416 became the only Canadian area code to serve just one rate centre and just one city. Many of Canada's larger cities, especially "megacities" that have been created from mergers of previously separate cities, are split between multiple rate centres that have never been amalgamated. Toronto is an exception and has been a single rate centre, which is by far Canada's largest, since 1977, with the merger of the historical Agincourt, Don Mills, Islington, New Toronto, Scarborough, West Hill, Weston, and Willowdale exchanges into the Toronto exchange.

The 1993 split had been intended as a long-term solution for Canada's largest toll-free calling zone. Within five years, however, 416 was once again close to exhaustion.  Toronto's size and status as a single rate centre have caused numbers to tend to be used up fairly quickly. Therefore, the number allocation problem was not nearly as serious as in other Canadian cities that are split between multiple rate centres. However, it was obvious that Toronto needed another area code. Splitting Toronto between two area codes, a solution adopted in the United States for cities like New York City, Chicago and Los Angeles, was ruled out because of the area's high population density and the lack of a suitable boundary along which to split. Another option was an overlay area code, which would cover the same area as 416. Overlays were then a new concept that was somewhat controversial because of the requirement for ten-digit dialling. However, Bell and other telephone companies pressed for an overlay since they wanted to spare their customers the expense and burden of having to change their numbers, which would have required a massive reprogramming of cellular telephones. Also, it would have been extremely difficult to split Toronto since it is a single rate centre. Ultimately, the decision was made to implement an overlay.

On March 5, 2001, 416 was overlaid with area code 647, which is Canada's first overlay code. The implementation of 647 made ten-digit dialling mandatory in Toronto. However, within a decade, both 416 and 647 were close to exhaustion. A new overlay area code, 437, started operation on March 25, 2013. That effectively allocates 24 million numbers to one city of 2.5 million people. 

Area code 942 has been reserved for Toronto's future use but is expected not to be needed until 2025. Area code 387 has been reserved for Toronto's future use as well.

Since the implementation of area code 647, overlays have become the preferred solution for area code relief in Canada, as they allow carriers an easy workaround for the number allocation problem. As of 2019, only four Canadian area codes (506, 709, 807 and 867) are still single-code areas, with no overlay, and so still allow seven-digit local dialing. (However, overlays are already planned for 506 and 709 as they will both exhaust by 2027.)

Future
A 2020 exhaust analysis by the NANPA projects a 2025 exhaustion date for the 416/647/437 numbering plan area.

Local calling area
Toronto is the centre of the largest local calling area in Canada, and one of the largest in North America. As of 2013, the following points in area code 905 were a local call to +1-416 Toronto: Ajax-Pickering, Aurora, Beeton, Bethesda, Bolton, Brampton, Caledon East, Campbellville, Castlemore, Claremont,  Georgetown, Gormley, King City,  Markham, Milton, Mississauga (rate centres Clarkson, Cooksville, Malton, Nobleton, Port Credit and Streetsville) Oak Ridges, Oakville, Palgrave,  Richmond Hill, Schomberg, Snelgrove, South Pickering, Stouffville, Thornhill, Tottenham, Unionville, Uxbridge, Vaughan (rate centres Kleinburg, Maple and Woodbridge) and Victoria. Caledon in area code 519 is also a local call to Toronto. Many of these suburban areas are long-distance to each other, particularly, but not exclusively, those which are across Toronto from each other (i.e. north versus east versus west of Toronto).

In popular culture

In the Greater Toronto Area, the terms the 416 is also used to describe the area within Toronto proper, and Toronto residents are called 416ers.  In recent years, Toronto has been increasingly referred to as "The 6". The suburbs are referred to as the 905 or the 905 belt, and suburbanites are called 905ers (in this use the term does not include the more distant parts of area code 905, such as Niagara Falls).

The 647 area code does not carry the same strong geographic associations as it disproportionately contains nomadic services (such as mobile telephones and voice over IP); an incumbent Bell land line is hard-wired to a specific location in area 416, postal code M. Some have paid a premium for a true 416 number as the code gives the appearance of a local, long-established business instead of a new entrant.

On March 17, 1966, The Munsters episode "A Visit from Johann" depicted a person-to-person call to a Happy Valley Lodge in the 416 area code.  A hamlet of Happy Valley exists in King Township, in 416 at the time but now (as part of York Region) in 905.

In 1994, food delivery chain Pizza Pizza obtained a Canadian registered trademark on its 416 telephone number, 967–1111, which had featured in distinctive radio advertising jingles since the 1970s.

Toronto rapper Maestro Fresh Wes rendered homage to the area code in his 1998 song "416/905 (TO Party Anthem)". Rapper Drake has a tattoo of the number on his rib to symbolize Toronto as his birthplace. Drake has also released his fourth studio album, titled Views, referring to the 416 and 647 area codes. His album picture is of him sitting on top of the CN Tower in Toronto.

Central office codes

All central office codes reside within the rate centre of Toronto. In some cases, 416 prefixes are available to wire centres outside Toronto city limits which serve Toronto subscribers (such as MALTON22 in Mississauga, which serves an airport hotel strip in Toronto).

Exchange names
Toronto's original telephone exchanges were manual; each had an exchange name and a block of four-digit numbers. The "GRover exchange" at Kingston Road and Main Street in East Toronto was the first Canadian dial exchange in 1924. (Montréal got its first dial telephones one year later.) The numbers would be dialled as six digits (2L+4N), e.g., "GRover 1234" was dialled GR-1234 (or 47–1234). Conversion to seven-digit (2L+5N) format began in 1951, and continued up to the introduction of direct distance dialling (DDD) in 1958.

Toronto numbers that were converted from six-digit (2L+4N) dial format, or from manual service, include:
 416–363, 364, 366, 368 (EMpire 3,4,6,8) were ADelaide, ELgin, PLaza and WAverly in the Adelaide St (Queen West) area west of downtown. These were the first to be lengthened to 2L+5N in 1951–1953.
 416-861 (UNiversity 1) was TRinity exchange in the Adelaide St (Queen West) area west of downtown (lengthened to 2L+5N in 1955).
 416–921, 922, 923, 924 (WAlnut 1,2,3,4) were RAndolph, KIngsdale, MIdway and PRincess (lengthened to 2L+5N in 1954) in the Annex.
 416–691, 694, 699 (OXford 1,4,9) were HOward, GRover, OXford (lengthened to 2L+5N in 1955) in East Toronto. These numbers usually relate to the Beaches and Upper Beaches neighbourhoods or to Crescent Town in East York.
 416–461, 463, 465, 466 (HOward 1,3,5,6) were RIverdale, GErrard, GLadstone, HArgrave east of downtown (lengthened to 2L+5N in 1957).
 416–483, 485, 488, 489 (HUdson 3,5,8,9) were MOhawk, MAyfair (lengthened to 2L+5N in 1958) and HUdson, HYland (lengthened to 2L+5N in 1953); these served the Eglinton area, then the northernmost point on the TTC subway (1954).
 416–782, 783 (RUssell 2,3) were ORchard, REdfern (lengthened to 2L+5N in 1958) in the Willowdale/Weston areas in the north of the city.
 416–762, 766, 767, 769 (ROger 2,6,7,9) were MUrray, ROdney, LYndhurst, JUnction (lengthened to 2L+5N in 1955) in the Runnymede/Toronto Junction area in the west end.
 416–531, 532, 533, 534, 535, 536 (LEnnox 1,2,3,4,5,6) were MElrose, LAkeside, KEnwood, OLiver, LLoydbrook, LOmbard in the Dufferin Street area west of downtown (lengthened to 2L+5N in 1956).

Additional named exchanges were created (as 2L+5N) in the late 1950s to accommodate expansion into then-growing suburbs such as Don Mills (GArden), Agincourt (AXminster/CYpress), Islington (BElmont/CEdar), New Toronto (CLifford), Scarborough (AMherst, PLymouth), West Hill (ATlantic), Weston (CHerry, MElrose) and Willowdale (BAldwin/ACademy). Exchange names were phased out in 1961–1966 in favour of plain seven-digit numbers.

 416-202 usually relate to Metrolinx.
 416-203 usually relate to the Canadian Forces Detachment at Fort York.
 416-205 numbers usually relate to the Canadian Broadcasting Corporation
 416–212, 416–314, 416–325, 416–326, 416-327 and 416-585 numbers usually relate to the Government of Ontario.
 416–307, 416–308, 416–982, 416-983 and 416-944 numbers usually relate to the Toronto-Dominion Bank.
 416-310 numbers are routed according to the caller's geographic origin for customer service or delivery dispatch uses, such as pizza delivery. These numbers are valuable for marketing purposes because a 310 number is in effect registered in all GTA area codes, (416-310-1234 and 905-310-1234, direct to the same phone line) and having to specify area code is unnecessary. Indeed, 310 numbers are the only regular numbers can be successfully dialed without area code in most of Ontario.
 416-338 and 416-392 numbers usually relate to the City of Toronto Municipal Government; Toronto Fire Services uses 338 numbers
 416-340 usually relate to the University Health Network including Toronto General Hospital, Toronto Western Hospital, and Princess Margaret Cancer Centre
 416-341 numbers usually relate to the Rogers Centre.
 416-344 numbers usually relate to the Workplace Safety & Insurance Board of Ontario.
 416-384 numbers usually relate to Bell Media offices.
 416–392, 416–393, 416–394, 416–395, 416-396 and 416-397 numbers usually relate to the Toronto District School Board, Toronto Catholic District School Board, and city agencies such as the Toronto Public Library, Toronto Transit Commission and Toronto Employment & Community Services. Transit schedule info is available on +1-416-393-INFO.
 416-469 numbers usually related to Toronto East General Hospital.
 416-480 numbers usually relate to Sunnybrook Health Sciences Centre.
 416-491 numbers usually relate to Seneca College.
 416-633 usually relate to the Canadian Forces Detachment at Denison Armoury.
 416-635 usually relate to the Canadian Forces Detachment at Moss Park Armoury.
 416-736 numbers usually relate to York University.
 416–739, 416-954 and 416-973 numbers usually relate to the Government of Canada.
 416-756 numbers usually relate to North York General Hospital.
 416–764, 416-446 and 416-935 usually relate to Rogers Communications offices.
 416-776 usually relate to the Greater Toronto Airports Authority
 416-808 numbers usually relate to the Toronto Police.
 416-861 usually relates to the Hudson's Bay Company head offices in the Simpson Tower.
 416-866 numbers usually relate to the Bank of Nova Scotia; 416-933 is also used by Scotiabank.
 416-867 usually relate to St. Michael's Hospital and Bank Of Montreal
 416-870 and 416-872 are so-called choke exchanges reserved for high-volume mass calling services like radio station contest lines, ticket agencies and recorded/automated messages.
 416-941 usually related to both Eaton's, then Sears Canada's head office at Toronto Eaton Centre before the company went defunct in 2018.
 416–974, 416–955, 416–313, 416–842, and 416-348 numbers usually relate to Royal Bank of Canada.
 416-978 and more recently 416-946 numbers usually relate to the University of Toronto.
 416-979 numbers usually relate to Toronto Metropolitan University.
 416-980 numbers usually relate to the Canadian Imperial Bank of Commerce; 416-784 and 416-780 also used by CIBC.

See also
List of North American area codes

References

Further reading

External links
 CNA exchange list for area +1-416
 CNA exchange list for area +1-647
 CNA exchange list for area +1-437
 Area code map of Canada

416
Communications in Ontario
Toronto